Helmut Kentler (2 July 1928 – 9 July 2008) was a German psychologist, sexologist and a professor of social education at the University of Hannover. Beginning in the late 1960s and continuing until the early 1990s, with the authorization and financial support of the Berlin Senate, Kentler placed neglected youth as foster children in the homes of single pedophile fathers for the ostensible purpose of resocializing them, while explicitly encouraging sexual contact between the foster fathers and their wards. This project was later dubbed the "Kentler Experiment" or the "Kentler Project." In his writings, Kentler advocated for pedophilia and his colleague, and former president of the International Academy of Sex Research, Gunter Schmidt claims to have received a letter from Kentler admitting to having started a sexually abusive relationship with his son at thirteen.

Education and study 
After graduating from high school, Kentler wanted to study theology to become a pastor. His father insisted he undertake technical vocational training. Kentler completed an apprenticeship as a locksmith at the Lokomotivfabrik Henschel in Kassel and subsequently studied electrical engineering at the RWTH Aachen. After the death of his father, he withdrew from his studies in Aachen. From 1953 to 1954, he trained as an interpreter in English and French. Afterwards he studied psychology, medicine, education and philosophy in Switzerland and Freiburg, Germany. During his studies, he participated in a field trial with young workers, which he documented and reflected on later in his 1959 book, Youth Work in the Industrial World. In it, he still explicitly proclaimed his Christian faith (according to Rüdiger Lautmann in his 2008 obituary on Kentler for the Humanistische Union); in later publications this was no longer the case. In 1960 he passed the main diploma examination for psychology.

Educational work for the Protestant Church, change to science 
After completing his studies he initially worked as a youth education officer at the Evangelische Akademie Arnoldshain. Afterwards he worked from 1962 to 1965 as a research assistant and "first pedagogue" in the Studienzentrum Josefstal (protestant youth work) at Neuhaus am Schliersee. The theory of an emancipatory youth work, which he played a decisive role in developing, made him known nationwide.
The following year he was assistant to Klaus Mollenhauer at the PH Berlin. Afterwards he became head of the department for social pedagogy and adult education at the Pedagogical Centre Berlin and from 1967 to 1974 departmental director there. In 1975, he received his doctorate in Hanover with the dissertation Parents learn sexual education, which also appeared as a book and reached a total circulation of 30,000 copies by the 1990s. In 1976, he was appointed as a university lecturer for the training of vocational school teachers for special education at the University of Hanover, where he taught until his retirement in 1996.

Career 
Kentler was one of the advocates of an "emancipatory" youth work and is considered a representative of sexual education of the 1960s and 1970s. In his work as a court expert and expert on child and adolescent sexuality, he achieved recognition in professional circles. From 1979 to 1982 he was president of the German Society for Social-Scientific Sexual Research, later he was on the advisory board of the Humanistische Union. He was also a member of the Deutsche Gesellschaft für Sexualforschung.

For Helmut Kentler, theory and practice were tightly knit throughout his life. His development of a theory of emancipatory youth work grew out of his work with adolescents and young adults during his studies and the five years he spent working in church educational institutions. He implemented in theory and practice group pedagogy and team work as a trusting and respectful cooperation of pedagogues with different professional competence and attempted to gain insight into psychosocial connections for learning and emancipation processes for young people and adults. This was a new concept for church educational work in the 1960s. In addition to his professional duties, he also worked in various fields of pedagogical practice in an advisory and teaching capacity. From 1970 to 1974, he sat on the pedagogical advisory board of the first Wohngemeinschaft for Trebegänger and runaway Fürsorge children at Maxdorfer Steig, sponsored by the Berlin Senate.

During the student riots in Berlin, Kentler was temporarily active as a "psychological consultant for police issues". The sexual liberation movement of Berlin students in communities and shared flats resulted in his advocacy of an emancipatory sexual education in the home, which was also scientifically reflected in his dissertation in 1975 and made him an expert in sexual education in the further course of his professional life.

At the end of the 1960s, in a model experiment, he placed several neglected 13 to 15-year-old boys, whom he considered "secondary mental defectives", with pedophiles he knew, claiming that this would reintegrate them into society and to allow them to grow into mature adults. Due to the criminal offense associated with it, he made this public only after its statute of limitations had expired more than a decade later. Kentler claimed that the experiment would help the children to regain social stability through exposure to pedophiles. He was aware that the adults would most likely perform sexual acts on the minors. The scandal was publicly debated in 2015 and the Senate Youth Administration then commissioned the scientist Teresa Nentwig from the University of Göttingen to investigate the incident and forward her findings to the relevant authorities.

At a factional hearing of the FDP in 1981 Kentler reported: "These people only endured these moronic boys because they were in love and infatuated with them." In an expert opinion for the Senatsverwaltung für Familie, Frauen und Jugend he described the results of the 1988 trial as "a complete success". At that time he did not have to fear any criminal consequences because of the statute of limitations. He also maintained contacts with the former participants during his teaching activities in Hanover and, in an expert opinion for the Berlin Family Court in the early 1990s, recommended that one of the abused youths continue to stay with his pedophile foster father, whom he described as a pedagogical natural talent.

Kentler was single, homosexual and had three adoptive sons and one foster son.

At the beginning of the 1990s, Kentler, having previously lived in a "huge, tall apartment in an old building" in Berlin, lived in the Gartenhofsiedlung in the Hannover district Marienwerder.

Positions

Sexuality and society 
In Kentler's view, it was not enough for parents to avoid putting obstacles in the way of their children's sexual desires; rather, parents should introduce their children to sexuality, because otherwise they "risk leaving them sexually underdeveloped, becoming sexual cripples". Parents would bear a high degree of responsibility here: "Parents must be made aware that a good relationship of trust between children and parents cannot be maintained if children are denied the satisfaction of such urgent and urgent needs as sexual ones." Early experiences of coitus are useful, because teenagers with coitus experience "demand an independent world of teenagers and more often reject the norms of adults".

One of Kentler's particular concerns was the reduction of sexual repression amongst girls: "Often the repressive education was so successful that they no longer feel any sexual pressure. A sexually open-minded boy then calls such a girl 'uptight', 'unfashionable'.

Based on his view that children can have sexual needs even before puberty, he made a distinction between voluntary sexual interactions among peers or with adults from sexual abuse of children: "Sexually satisfied children who have a good relationship of trust with their parents, especially in sexual matters, are best protected against sexual seduction and sexual attacks." Kentler warned the parents against being concerned over rape or molestation of children by adults: "The wrong thing to do now would be for parents to lose their nerve, panic and run straight to the police. If the adult had been considerate and tender, the child could even have enjoyed sexual contact with him". Kentler considered equal and non-discriminatory sexual relationships between adults and children to be acceptable: "If such relationships are not discriminated against by the environment, then the more the older one feels responsible for the younger one, the more positive consequences for personality development can be expected", he wrote in 1974 in his foreword to the brochure Zeig mal!

Activity as court expert 
Kentler also acted as a forensic expert in abuse cases. In 1997, he declared about the almost 30 cases he had dealt with up to that point: "I am very proud that so far all cases I have dealt with have been terminated with the discontinuation of proceedings or even acquittals." Kentler did not attribute injustice to the sexual activity of adults with children, but to the violence that may have been used. This, however, he believed to be atypical, since real paedophiles do not use violence, but on the contrary are "highly sensitive to damage to children". In 1999, Kentler announced a book publication about "the approximately 35 lawsuits against innocent people that I have accompanied as an expert witness," but then left the manuscript (Parents Under Suspicion – Of Sexual Abuse) unpublished. In the same year he declared:

Reception 
Kentler did not hide the fact that he placed young people with pedophiles he knew. He reported about it in his book Leihväter from 1989. After the magazine EMMA had reported on his activities in 1993, he was shouted down by feminist activists at an event in Hanover in 1993 and received a punch in the face from a listener.

Jan Feddersen praised Kentler in an obituary in the Tageszeitung of 12 July 2008, as a "meritorious fighter for a permissive sexual morality". Some protestant church authorities expressed a similar opinion. In an obituary, the Study Centre for Protestant Youth Work pointed out Kentler's controversial positions, but also acknowledged his work for "institutional structure and professional socialisation" and the attempts to make homosexuality socially acceptable in the church. While the Working Group of Protestant Youth in Germany immediately removed the obituary after a synod motion, the Kentler Study Centre defended Kentler without addressing his misconduct in exposing children to sexual exploitation, which was broadly presented in the motion. Rather, Helmut Kentler "has had a lasting influence on the conceptual development and the student research project in Josefstal to this day".

The Humanist Union pays positive tribute to Kentler's person and body of work. In his obituary it says: "A lighthouse of our advisory board has gone out. Like no other, Helmut Kentler embodied the humanistic task of an enlightened sex education, and he was also a role model for public science. (...) His habitus combined the qualities of competence, authenticity and closeness in a rare way, with which Kentler impressed his readers and listeners alike ... Since he immediately aroused sympathies, many have confided in him."

Ursula Enders, the founder of the victim support association "Zartbitter", criticizes Kentler as a man with pedosexual-friendly positions. Stephan Hebel assessed in an editorial of the Frankfurter Rundschau in March 2010 a passage from Kentler's foreword to the 1974 brochure Zeig mal! as an "open call to paedophilia"; similarly Alice Schwarzer expressed herself in the magazine EMMA. The Protestant authors Andreas Späth and Menno Aden also sharply attack Kentler in their book Die missbrauchte Republik – Aufklärung über die Aufklärer. Due to an article by Ursula Enders in EMMA in 1997 "at the last minute" Kentler was prevented from receiving the Magnus Hirschfeld Prize in 1997.

In Die Zeit in October 2013 Adam Soboczynski critically examined Kentler. Soboczynski explained that Die Zeit had offered publication opportunities to the "pedophile-friendly scientist" at the end of the 1960s with a lack of sensitivity based on the connection between anti-fascism and sexual liberation, as Kentler had claimed in reference to Wilhelm Reich. Georg Diez criticized this text in his column on Spiegel online:
Soboczynski had neither taken Kentler seriously nor really analysed him. His text is regarded as a series of obsessive, confused settlements with the 68er-movement, he makes hardly provable, "tightly screwed assertions"; for example that sexual liberation was regarded as an anti-fascist project.

In 2013, the political scientist Franz Walter from the Göttingen Institute for Democracy Research, who at the time was investigating the former position of parts of the Greens and FDP on pedophilia, assigned Kentler a key role in German networks of pedophile activists.

Allegations against Kentler 
In 2015, after public pressure, the Berlin Senate Administration commissioned a study from the political scientist Teresa Nentwig of the Institute for Democracy Research in Göttingen on Kentler's pedosexual "experiment" conducted in Berlin in the late 1960s with the support of the Youth Welfare Office. In this context the Berlin Senator for Education Sandra Scheeres called the "experiment" at that time a crime in state responsibility. Affected persons, who had contacted the responsible senator in 2017, expressed their disappointment about the lack of support. In 2017/18, Nentwig was also commissioned in Lower Saxony to research the effects of Kentler's activities. Kentler also dealt with young people with behavioural problems in Hanover, also had contacts with the youth welfare office in Hanover and on their behalf was supposed to provide scientific support for the first care of a lesbian couple, but this did not come about because the couple decided to withdraw from the care for personal reasons. Whether Kentler himself was sexually assaulting young people, such as his foster and adopted sons or his tutoring students, is still an open question, although his colleague Gunter Schmidt has claimed Kentler disclosed having sexually abused one of his sons from the age thirteen and through adulthood until the son committed suicide in 1991.

In January 2018 the Leibniz Universität Hannover announced that it had initiated further investigations into Kentler. "I am downright shocked that at that time the executive and the judiciary let themselves be swallowed up by it," said President Volker Epping at the New Year's reception. "I am also completely irritated that the professional community of this acting Kentler did not comment, did not cry out!" Only after the completion of the project "The Role of the Sexologist in the Discourse on Pedosexuality – for example Helmut Kentler", which was funded by the Lower Saxony Ministry of Science and Culture, did the university (nine years after Kentler's death) realise the extent of the case. The aim of the further investigation will be to examine the circumstances of Kentler's doctorate, appointment and work until his retirement. This also includes the behaviour of the university, faculty and department with regard to his person. For a proper processing of the case, contracts are awarded to external, independent persons.

On 15 June 2020, a report prepared by scientists entitled "Helmut Kentler's Work in Berlin Child and Youth Services" was presented in Berlin. In this context, the Berlin Senator for Education Sandra Scheeres promised those affected by abuse financial compensation by the State of Berlin.

Works (selection) 
 Jugendarbeit in der Industriewelt. Bericht von einem Experiment. 2. Auflage. Juventa Verlag, München 1962.
 Was ist Jugendarbeit?, zus. mit C. W. Mueller, K. Mollenhauer und H. Giesecke, Juventa, München 1964.
 Für eine Revision der Sexualpädagogik. Juventa-Verl., München 1967.
 Jugendarbeit mit emanzipierter Jugend. In: Deutsche Jugend, 1969, Heft 5.
 Eltern lernen Sexualerziehung. Rowohlt, Reinbek bei Hamburg 1995 (1. Auflage 1975).
 Leihväter. Kinder brauchen Väter. Rowohlt, Reinbek bei Hamburg 1989.
 Sexualwesen Mensch. Piper, München 1988.
 Die Menschlichkeit der Sexualität. Kaiser, München 1983.
 Taschenlexikon Sexualität. Schwann, Düsseldorf 1982.
 Sexualerziehung. Rowohlt, Reinbek bei Hamburg 1981 (1. Auflage 1970).
 Urlaub, einmal anders. Düsseldorf (Hrsg. DGB-BuVo, Abt.Jug.) 1975.
 Texte zur Sozio-Sexualität. Leske, Opladen 1973.
 Zeig mal! (Vorwort von H. Kentler); Autorin Helga Fleischhauer-Hardt mit Fotografien von Will McBride; Jugenddienst-Verlag, Wuppertal 1974.
 Täterinnen und Täter beim sexuellen Missbrauch von Jungen. In: Katharina Rutschky, Reinhardt Wolff (Hrsg.): Handbuch sexueller Mißbrauch. Klein, Hamburg 1999.

Literature 
 Andreas Späth, Menno Aden (Hrsg.): Die missbrauchte Republik – Aufklärung über die Aufklärer. (mit Beiträgen u. a. von Christa Meves, Harald Seubert und Albert Wunsch), Verlag Inspiration Un Limited, London und Hamburg 2010, S. 127–148: Die Pädophilenbewegung (Helmut Kentler).
 Teresa Nentwig u. a., Institut für Demokratieforschung Georg-August-Universität Göttingen: Die Unterstützung pädosexueller bzw. päderastischer Interessen durch die Berliner Senatsverwaltung. Am Beispiel eines "Experiments" von Helmut Kentler und der "Adressenliste zur schwulen, lesbischen & pädophilen Emanzipation". Studie im Auftrag der Berliner Senatsverwaltung für Bildung, Jugend und Wissenschaft, 2016. (PDF)

References

External links 
 
 
 Teresa Nentwig: Abschlussbericht zu dem Forschungsprojekt: Die Unterstützung pädosexueller bzw. päderastischer Interessen durch die Berliner Senatsverwaltung. Am Beispiel eines „Experiments“ von Helmut Kentler und der „Adressenliste zur schwulen, lesbischen & pädophilen Emanzipation“. Studie im Auftrag der Berliner Senatsverwaltung für Bildung, Jugend und Wissenschaft. Unter Mitwirkung von Hanna Feesche, Sören Isele und Malte Lübke, Göttinger Institut für Demokratieforschung 11/2016.
 Stephan Hebel: Ein Jahrzehnt quälender Experimente. Leitartikel der Frankfurter Rundschau vom 8. März 2010
 Nina Apin, Astrid Geisler, Brigitte Marquardt: Der Versuch, Die tageszeitung, 14. September 2013
 Felix Hackenbruch: Senat lässt „Kentler-Experiment“ neu untersuchen, Der Tagesspiegel, 15. Oktober 2018
 Simone Schmollack: Skandal um pädophilen Sozialpädagogen: Der Mann des Schattenwissens, taz, 15. August 2019
 Frank Bachner: Warum die Uni Hannover Helmut Kentler gewähren ließ, Tagesspiegel, 14. August 2019
 Odenwaldschule Teil eines Netzwerks? Missbrauchsskandal erschüttert die Pädagogik, in: https://www.news4teachers.de/2020/06/monstroeser-missbrauchsskandal-berlins-bildungssenatorin-spricht-von-behoerdenversagen/
 The German Experiment That Placed Foster Children with Pedophiles, The New Yorker, July 19, 2021

1928 births
2008 deaths
German psychologists
German sexologists
Kentler
20th-century psychologists
RWTH Aachen University alumni
Academic staff of the University of Hanover